General Ely may refer to:

Hanson Edward Ely (1867–1958), U.S. Army major general
William J. Ely (1911–2017), U.S. Army lieutenant general
Paul Ély (1897–1975), French Army general